"Toys, Toys, Toys, Choke, Toys, Toys, Toys" is a song by Biffy Clyro from their second album, The Vertigo of Bliss, and was the band's fourth single. It appeared as a double A-side with "Joy.Discovery.Invention", and was released on CD and 7". The B-side to the vinyl, "All The Way Down (Chapter 2)", originally first appeared on the band's debut independent single, "Iname", in 1999.

Overview
Simon Neil has commented on the song, saying:

Track 3 on the vinyl release is a new version of a song that originally appeared on Iname.

Track listings
Songs and lyrics by Simon Neil. Music by Biffy Clyro.
CD BBQ361CD
 "Joy.Discovery.Invention" – 3:38
 "Toys, Toys, Toys, Choke, Toys, Toys, Toys" – 5:28
 "The Houses of Roofs" – 5:12
7" BBQ361
 "Toys, Toys, Toys, Choke, Toys, Toys, Toys" (Edit) – 4:08
 "Joy.Discovery.Invention" – 3:38
 "All The Way Down: Chapter 2" – 3:49

Personnel
 Simon Neil – guitar, vocals
 James Johnston – bass, vocals
 Ben Johnston – drums, vocals
 Chris Sheldon – producer
 Paul McCallum - video director

Notes

2002 singles
Biffy Clyro songs
Songs written by Simon Neil
Song recordings produced by Chris Sheldon
2002 songs
Beggars Banquet Records singles